Rialto is a comune (municipality) in the Province of Savona in the Italian region Liguria, located about  southwest of Genoa and about  southwest of Savona.

Rialto borders the following municipalities: Bormida, Calice Ligure, Calizzano, Magliolo, Osiglia, and Tovo San Giacomo.

Demographic evolution

Twin towns — sister cities
Rialto is twinned with:

  Cauto Cristo, Cuba

See also 
 Bric Gettina

References

Cities and towns in Liguria